Horjul is a small town in the Inner Carniola region of Slovenia. It is the administrative center of the Municipality of Horjul. It developed from a clustered village on the north side of the marshy valley of Horjulka Creek. It includes the hamlets of Vovčne and Lipalca. Elevations in the territory of the settlement include Brezovec Hill (471 m), Rog Hill (448 m), and Lupar Hill (ca. 420 m) to the north, and Rožman Peak (452 m), Kremenik Hill (406 m), and Čelc Hill (391 m) to the south.

Name
The origin of the name Horjul is unclear; various theories have tried to derive it from a Romance or Celtic root. In the local dialect the town is known as Hrjuj or Hurjujc in the lowlands, and as Frjuj or Frjujc in the hills above the settlement.

History
A prehistoric Celtic cemetery was discovered in the village at the beginning of the 20th century. Although the finds have since been lost, this late Iron  Age site is the only evidence of a Celtic presence in the Horjul Valley. The discovery of some Roman-era water pipes is associated with the Polhov Gradec Villa rustica. Known as the Vovčne–Saint Margaret archaeological site, the cemetery is registered as cultural heritage.

A part-time school was established in Horjul in the sexton's house in 1855. A regular school was established in 1861. In 1862 the sexton's house was torn down and a school building was built. A new school building was built in 1862. The current school building dates from 1975.

Second World War
Horjul was annexed to Italy as part of the Province of Ljubljana on 3 May 1941. Partisan activity began in the Horjul area in June 1941. The mayor of Horjul, Janez (or Ivan) Bastič and his wife Marjana were abducted, tortured, and murdered by the Partisans on 14 June 1942. A White Guard post was established in Horjul in November 1942. After the capitulation of Italy in September 1943, this was converted to a Home Guard post. Horjul was bombarded by German forces in November 1943, with the loss of several houses. The Partisans launched an unsuccessful attack against the Home Guard post on 8 September 1944.

Religious heritage

Church

The parish church in the town of Horjul is dedicated to Saint Margaret and belongs to the Ljubljana Archdiocese. It was first mentioned in written sources in 1526. The church was originally built in Gothic style and was renovated in 1678. The rectory dates from 1787, when the Parish of Horjul was established. Two side chapels were built in 1858 following plans by Anton Leben from Polhov Gradec. The church's frescoes depicting Saint Margaret and various saints were painted in 1877 by Janez Šubic, who also created the altar painting of Saint Margaret in 1876. The church's main altar and side altar were made by the Toman workshop of Ljubljana.

Cemetery
The town's walled cemetery was reworked in 1922 and 1923 following plans by Jože Plečnik. It lies in the northern part of the town, northwest of the school and Saint Margaret's Church. In the center there is a large wooden crucifix bearing the year 1881 and a monument. There are several gravestones from the 18th and early 19th centuries.

Shrines

Several wayside shrines in Horjul are registered as cultural heritage:
 There is a closed two-story chapel-shrine north of the road in the center of the town. It has a square hip roof topped by a small belfry. It was built in 1923 and is dedicated to Saint Anthony. It was designed by the architect Janko Omahen (1898–1980).
An open chapel-shrine dedicated to Our Lady of the Rosary stands in the northern part of the town, west of the school. It dates from 1895 and has a painted interior with a statue of the Virgin Mary in a niche.
An open chapel-shrine dedicated to Saint Joseph stands near the woods in the northern part of the town. It contains a statue of the saint and was dedicated on 2 December 1898 in honor of the fiftieth anniversary of the rule of Emperor Franz Joseph I.

Other cultural heritage
In addition to its religious cultural heritage, several other structures in Horjul are registered as cultural heritage:
 The farm at Livada no. 3 (formerly Horjul no. 19) stands in the southeastern part of the village center. It has a stone two-story house with the year 1830 carved into the door casing. It has a symmetrical gabled roof covered with concrete tiles. A barn is connected to the house; it has a wooden upper story.
 The farm at Vrhnika Street no. 150 stand on Mavsar Hill, north of Velika Ligojna and east of Žažar. It has a one-story rectangular stone house with the year 1843 carved into the black stone door casing and a statue of Saint Florian in a niche in the gable. There is a barn, partially built of wood, with the year 1840 carved into it, a hayrack, an herb garden, and a linden tree in the courtyard.

Notable people
Notable people that were born or lived in Horjul include:
 Kristina Brenk (1911–2009), writer of juvenile literature and translator
 Cene Logar (1913–1995), philosopher and communist-era dissident
 Janez Logar (1908–1987), literary historian
 Tine Logar (1916–2002), linguist and Slavic specialist
 Anton Oblak (1871–1953), rural writer
 Janez Potrebuješ (1830–1904), sculptor
 Rudolf Hribernik a.k.a. "Svarun" (1921–2002), Yugoslav general and politician
 Aleš Stanovnik (1901–1942), political activist and journalist
 Ivan Stanovnik (1891–?), writer of juvenile literature and political activist
 Andrej Zamejic (1824–1907), religious writer and translator

References

External links
Horjul on Geopedia

Populated places in the Municipality of Horjul